Kettering General Hospital is an NHS hospital in Kettering, Northamptonshire, England. It is managed by the Kettering General Hospital NHS Foundation Trust.

History
The hospital, which replaced a small local dispensary, was opened after a fund-raising campaign by the Hon. Charles Spencer MP in October 1897. An operating theatre and extra consulting rooms opened in 1902, an X-ray department opened in 1905 and an eye department opened in 1908. It joined the National Health Service in 1948.

As part of a major redevelopment plan, a major new main ward block and Post-Graduate Education Centre were completed in 1976 and the new Rockingham Wing, for the treatment of maternity and gynecology patients, opened in 1977. A new accident and emergency department opened in 1993, the Centenary Wing opened in 2000 and the Jubilee Wing, for the treatment of dermatology patients, opened in 2003. The new Foundation Wing, which included children's and cardiac wards and a new intensive care unit, was completed in April 2013.

In 2021 the hospital was said to have the ‘most cramped and limited emergency department in the UK’.  It was allocated £46 million for an urgent care hub but the trust pleaded for £6 million in 2021/2 and £29m in 2022-23 to start making improvements to the department.

References

Further reading

External links

Buildings and structures in Kettering
Hospital buildings completed in 1897
NHS hospitals in England
Hospitals in Northamptonshire